The Calamba Premiere International Park (CPIP), established in 1999, is one of the first industrial parks in the Philippines. It is a comprehensively-planned industrial estate located at Batino, Barandal, and Prinza in Calamba, Laguna and provides a workplace for technology-based, light and medium industries.

Industrial Park Locators 
One of the most important of the industrial parks in the Philippines, with four in this region of Calabarzon in Laguna: Calamba Premiere International Park or CPIP (formerly known as Calamba Premiere Industrial Park), Carmelray Industrial Park 1 in Canlubang, Carmelray Industrial Park 2 in Punta, and Light Industry and Science Park of the Philippines II in Real.

Locators

See also 
 Light Industry and Science Park of the Philippines II

References

Industrial parks in the Philippines
Buildings and structures in Calamba, Laguna